WUOA-LD, virtual channel 46 (UHF digital channel 28), is a low-power television station licensed to Birmingham, Alabama, United States. The station is owned by Innovate Corp. WUOA-LD's transmitter is located on Red Mountain on the south side of Birmingham.

History 
The station began broadcasting in January 1988 as an owned-and-operated station of the Trinity Broadcasting Network. The station originally broadcast on UHF channel 52 under its original callsign W52AI. It became W53AZ in 1990 after moving the signal to UHF channel 53. Two years later, the station moved its signal again to channel 51 and changing the call letters to W51BY. It remained a TBN translator until 2003. In 2003, the station moved its signal to UHF channel 46, and changed the callsign again, this time to W46DK. It was purchased by the University of Alabama, whose communications department converted the station to a translator of the university-owned WVUA-CA.

In 2015, the station went silent as W46AY was obligated to be converted to digital as the digital TV transition deadline for low-power stations was scheduled for September 1 of that year. The station's callsign was changed to the original WUOA-LD. In Summer 2016, DTV America Corporation purchased the station and converted it into an affiliate of Katz Broadcasting-operated Laff network. This was the second DTV America-owned station to sign on in the state of Alabama (the first was MyNetworkTV/Doctor TV affiliate WDSF-LD which signed on in 2014). 
The station also launched second and third subchannels to run FremantleMedia's Buzzr network, and Laff’s sister network Escape, respectively.

Subchannels

References

External links

 
 

UOA-LD
Innovate Corp.
Buzzr affiliates
GetTV affiliates
Classic Reruns TV affiliates
Television channels and stations established in 1988